Viktor Rapinski (born June 17, 1981) is a former Belarusian cyclist.

Palmares

1999
 National Time Trial Champion
2000
 National Time Trial Champion
2001
 National Time Trial Champion
2002
1st International Cycling Classic
1st stages 1, 3, 5, 9 and 14
2003
1st Fitchburg Longsjo Classic
1st International Cycling Classic
1st stages 9 and 12
2nd Nature Valley Grand Prix
1st stage 4
2nd CSC Invitational
2nd Vuelta de Bisbee
1st stage 2 (TT)
3rd Wachovia Classic
2004
1st stage 5 Tour of Turkey
1st stage 2 Fitchburg Longsjo Classic
1st stages 1, 4 and 9 Tour of Qinghai Lake
2005
2nd National Time Trial Championship

References

1981 births
Living people
Belarusian male cyclists